Persoonia chamaepeuce, commonly known as the dwarf geebung or heathy geebung, is a plant in the family Proteaceae and is endemic to south-eastern Australia. It is a prostrate shrub with crowded, linear leaves and yellow flowers in the leaf axils.

Description
The young branches are more or less glabrous. The central style is surrounded by four yellow anthers which are also joined at the base with the tips rolled back, so that it resembles a cross when viewed end-on. The ovary is glabrous.

It is sometimes confused with the similar Persoonia chamaepitys, but this latter species has more crowded terete leaves.

Taxonomy and naming
Persoonia chamaepeuce was first formally described in 1856 by Carl Meissner from an unpublished manuscript by Polish botanist John Lhotsky. Meissner's description was published in Prodromus Systematis Naturalis Regni Vegetabilis. The specific epithet (chamaepeuce) is derived from the Ancient Greek words chamai meaning "on the ground" or "dwarf" and peuke meaning "pine". German botanist Otto Kuntze proposed the binomial name Linkia chamaepeuce in 1891, from Cavanilles' original description of the genus Linkia but the name was eventually rejected in favour of Persoonia. In 1919, French botanist Michel Gandoger described three species all since reallocated to P. chamaepeuce;  P. effusa , P. myrioclada and P. viridula.  Gandoger described 212 taxa of Australian plants, almost all of which turned out to be species already described.

The genus was reviewed by Peter Weston for the Flora of Australia treatment in 1995, and P. chamaepeuce was placed in the Lanceolata group, a group of 54 closely related species with similar flowers but very different foliage. These species will often interbreed with each other where two members of the group occur, and hybrids of P. chamaepeuce have been reported with Persoonia asperula, Persoonia confertiflora and Persoonia linearis.

Distribution and habitat
The dwarf geebung grows in woodland and forest along the tablelands south from the New England district in New South Wales to Victoria where it is widely distributed and locally common in montane and subalpine areas.

Use in horticulture
This geebung is suitable as a groundcover and has well-displayed flowers. It can be propagated from seed but requires a sunny position in well-drained soil. Although slow growing, it adapts readily to cultivation in areas of temperate climate.

References

Flora of the Australian Capital Territory
Flora of New South Wales
Flora of Victoria (Australia)
chamaepeuce
Plants described in 1856